Aaron Courteney Thomas (born 6 May 1985) is a former English cricketer.  Thomas is a right-handed batsman who plays primarily as a wicketkeeper.  He was born at Edmonton, London.

Thomas made his debut in List-A cricket for the Nottinghamshire Cricket Board against Bedfordshire in the 2001 Cheltenham & Gloucester Trophy at Wardown Park, Luton, with the Board losing by 3 wickets.  His second and final List-A appearance for the Board came in 1st round of the 2002 Cheltenham & Gloucester Trophy against Oxfordshire at the Christ Church Ground, Oxford.  This round of the competition was played in 2001, with the Board losing by 5 wickets.  In his 2 List-A matches for the Board he batted in a single innings, scoring an unbeaten 7.  Behind the stumps he took a single catch and made a single stumping.

Thomas made a single first-class appearance for Nottinghamshire against India in 2003.  Not required to bat in the match, Thomas took a single catch behind the stumps.

In local cricket he currently represents the West Indian Cavaliers in the Nottinghamshire Cricket Board Premier League.

References

External links
Aaron Thomas at Cricinfo
Aaron Thomas at CricketArchive

1985 births
Living people
People from Edmonton, London
Cricketers from Greater London
English cricketers
Nottinghamshire Cricket Board cricketers
Nottinghamshire cricketers
Wicket-keepers